John Macleod is the deputy design director of the New York Times. Prior to that he art directed the Business  and Science sections of that paper. Before rejoining the Times in 1997, he was a founding partner in Design 5 a New York based design studio that specialized in book design, corporate identity and packaging. Under the tutelage of Milton Glaser he worked on the launch of American Lawyer and designed and art directed Corporate Finance Magazine. 

Macleod started and was principal in John Macleod Associates, a small studio that specialized in publication design. Clients included Asahi Shimbun in Tokyo, Business Day in Bangkok and the New York Times Regional Newspaper group. In 1980 he cofounded and was first president of the editorial illustration syndicate INX.

References

External links 
 New York Times

Year of birth missing (living people)
Living people
Newspaper designers